So Long, My Son (or Di Jiu Tian Chang) is a 2019 Chinese drama film directed by Wang Xiaoshuai. It was selected to compete for the Golden Bear at the 69th Berlin International Film Festival. At the festival, the film won the two main acting awards, with Wang Jingchun and Yong Mei winning the Silver Bear for Best Actor and Actress, respectively.

Plot
The film tells the story of two families over about thirty years: Liu Yaojun, Wang Liyun and their son Liu Xing ('Xingxing') together with Shen Yingming, Li Haiyan and their son Shen Hao ('Haohao'). Haohao and Xingxing were born on the same day. Both families were originally close and worked in the same factory, but became estranged in the 1980s.

Following the death of Xingxing, who drowned while playing by a reservoir with Haohao and other children, Yaojun and Liyun moved to another province (Fujian) and adopted a 'new' boy who they rename 'Xingxing', who grows estranged from his foster parents and leaves them as a young teenager. Yingming and Haiyan make a fortune in real estate and Haohao becomes a doctor.

When Haiyan is about to die, she invites Yaojun and Liyun to come back to their home town, which they hardly recognise after so much urban development. At the end, Haohao tells Xingxing's parents that he had forced Xingxing to play in the reservoir because the other kids were laughing at him and he felt embarrassed. Following this revelation, Liu Yaojun and Wang Liyun receive a phone call from their estranged, adopted son to say he is returning to visit them and bringing his new girlfriend.

The film portrays the journey of the two families with non-chronological flashbacks explaining the course of their lives. It speaks of affection, getting married, having and raising children (with the one-child policy), collective dismissal because of economic reform, ups and downs in life, grief and many social changes in China, resulting in complicated life experiences.

Cast

 Wang Jingchun (as Liu Yaojun)
 Yong Mei (as Wang Liyun)
 Qi Xi (as Shen Moli, sister of Shen Yingming)
 Roy Wang (as Liu Xing, son of Liu Yaojun and Wang Liyun)
 Du Jiang (as Shen Hao, son of Shen Yingming and Li Haiyan)
 Ai Liya (as Li Haiyan)
 Xu Cheng (as Shen Yingming)
 Li Jingjing (as Gao Meiyu, who become wife of Zhang Xinjian)
 Zhao Yanguozhang (as Zhang Xinjian)

Critical response
The site's critical consensus reads, "Intimate in focus yet epic in size and scope, So Long, My Son sets a heartbreaking saga of family tragedy against the changing face of modern China."

Awards and nominations

References

External links
  
 
 
 

2019 drama films
2019 films
Films shot in Fujian
Chinese drama films
Films directed by Wang Xiaoshuai
2010s Mandarin-language films